Louis-Pierre Deseine (1749–1822) was a French sculptor, who was born and died in Paris.  He is known above all for his portrait busts and imaginary portraits.

Life

Deseine trained in several ateliers, notably with Augustin Pajou, whose portrait bust he exhibited at the Salon of 1785. He won a first prize from the Académie, which sent him to study further in Rome (1781–84).

At the Salon of 1789, he showed  a portrait head of Belisarius.

In 1814 he published a history of the Académie royale de peinture et de sculpture, of which he had been a member. He described himself in 1814 as a member of the academies of Copenhagen and of Bordeaux, and as holding the post of first sculptor to the prince de Condé, for whom he had executed statues in the 1780s for the dining room at Chantilly, where some drawings and maquettes are preserved.

His elder brother, the little-known sculptor Claude-André Deseine (1740–1823) was a deaf-mute, whose Republican sensibilities and the exaggerated character of his portrait studies has encouraged Michael Levey see him as a contrast to his brother.

Works
 Portrait bust of Augustin Pajou (1785), terracotta, Paris, musée du Louvre
 Portrait bust of Claude-Pierre-Louis Durand at the age of four (1788), plaster,  Paris, musée du Louvre
 Portrait bust of Louis XVI (1790), marble, Versailles
 Portrait bust of Louis XVII (1790), marble, Versailles
 Mucius Scaevola (1791), marble, Paris, musée du Louvre. This was his morceau de reception when he became an Academician
 Portrait bust of Robespierre, (1792) terracotta, Musée de la Révolution française, Château de Vizille.
 Portrait bust of Charles VIII (1799), terracotta, Paris, école nationale supérieure des Beaux-Arts
 Portrait d'Abélard (1801), plaster bust in a stone medallion, Paris, École nationale supérieure des Beaux-Arts
 Portrait bust of Pope Pius VII (1805, shown at the Salon of 1806), plaster, tinted to resemble terracotta, Rueil-Malmaison, château de Malmaison
 Portrait bust of Pierre-Nicolas de Fontenay, sénateur (1743–1806) (1807), marble, Versailles
 Portrait bust of the duc de Luynes, pair de France, plaster, (1808, signed) sold, Château de Belle Eglise, 5 June 2006, lot 306
 Portrait bust of Jean-Baptiste Bessières, duc d'Istrie, maréchal de France (1813), plaster patinated bronze, île d'Aix, musées de l'île d'Aix
 Portrait bust of Louis-Antoine-Henri de Bourbon, duc d'Enghien (1817), plaster, Chantilly, musée Condé. The monument was finished after his death by his nephew.
 Portrait bust of Louis XVIII, (1817), Chantilly, musée Condé
 Maquette for the monument of the duc d'Enghien at Vincennes (1817), plaster over wood, Chantilly, musée Condé
 Maquette for the monument of the Cardinal de Belloy, plaster, (c 1819) musée du Louvre. The monument to Cardinal de Belloy was erected in Notre-Dame de Paris, 1819

Not dated
 Two Nymphs supporting a putto, terracotta, inscribed, sold  	 Sotheby's Arcade, 22 July  1993, lot 292
 Terracotta maquette, Virgin and Child (sold Bonham's London, 9 May 1996, lot 7
 The Entry at Vienna, bas-relief on the Arc de Triomphe du Carrousel, Paris
 Portrait bust of Jean-Joachim Winckelmann, tinted plaster, musée de Versailles,
 Comte Jean-Étienne-Marie Portalis, over lifesize statue, marble, Versailles

Drawings
Drawings by Deseine are at the musée du Louvre ("Étude d'un homme debout avec une draperie sur l'épaule") and the musée Condé, Chantilly ("Le Déluge", "Deux Romains saluant un empereur assis" and "Lars Porsenna"); the musée Condé also conserves two projects for the monument to the duc d'Enghien.

References

Sources
 Emmanuel Schwartz, Les Sculptures de l'École des Beaux-Arts de Paris. Histoire, doctrines, catalogue, (École nationale supérieure des Beaux-Arts, Paris) 2003.

External links
 

Prix de Rome for sculpture
18th-century French sculptors
French male sculptors
19th-century French sculptors
1749 births
1822 deaths
Artists from Paris
19th-century French male artists
18th-century French male artists